St.Jude’s Church, Chundale is a Roman Catholic Church located at Chundale, Wayanad, Kerala under the Diocese of Calicut. This Shrine is a pilgrim centre of North Kerala. The walls of the church are decorated by the paintings of Brother Angelo Bignami, with incidents of traditions believed to be performed by St Jude.

Feasts
The Annual Feast of St.Jude is celebrated on the Second Sunday of January Every Year.

References

Churches in Wayanad district
Roman Catholic churches in India